Hooker Township may refer to the following townships in the United States:

 Hooker Township, Dixon County, Nebraska
 Hooker Township, Gage County, Nebraska
 Hooker Township, Oklahoma, in Texas County